Alli Odunayo (born 23 December 1996; professionally known as Telz) is a Nigerian record producer and songwriter known for primarily producing Burna Boy‘s Grammy award winning album Twice As Tall and Patoranking 2020 commercially acclaimed hit song "Abule".

He is notable with the mainstream sound marks Funkula, which is well known in the Nigerian mainstream music scene.

Early life and career
He hails from Ondo State, Nigeria, A graduate of Babcock University with a degree. He began his recording career in 2011 with a few singles that he released in 2014 and 2015.

In 2020, Burna Boy's Twice As Tall album had Telz as the principal producer, with P Diddy serving as executive producer. The album also featured Timbaland's creations which later won the 63rd Annual Grammy Awards for Best Global Music Album category.

Production discography

Awards and nominations

References

Living people
Nigerian hip hop record producers
Nigerian songwriters
1996 births